Richard Lee "Rick" McKinney (born October 12, 1953) is an archer from the United States, who competed in the Olympic Games four times, winning a pair of silver medals.

McKinney was born in Decatur, Indiana. After finishing fourth in the individual event at the 1976 Summer Olympics, he won the world title in 1977 and again in 1983.  He finished second at the 1984 Summer Olympics to teammate and long-time rival Darrell Pace.  In the 1988 Games, he was sixth in the individual event and added a silver medal in the team event along with Pace and Jay Barrs.  He also competed in the 1992 Olympics.

McKinney was a nine-time national champion, and represented the United States at 10 editions of the World Archery Championships between 1975 and 1995. He won the individual title three times and the team title five consecutive times, making him the most successful US archer and second most successful male archer of all time. His back-to-back titles in 1983 and 1985 was the last time any male archer won consecutive titles.

McKinney has since focused on the development of carbon fiber-wrapped arrows.

In 2012, McKinney served as analyst for NBC's archery coverage at the Summer Olympics in London, and again served as archery analyst for NBC in the 2016 Summer Olympics in Rio.

References

1953 births
Living people
Sportspeople from Muncie, Indiana
American male archers
Archers at the 1976 Summer Olympics
Archers at the 1984 Summer Olympics
Archers at the 1988 Summer Olympics
Archers at the 1992 Summer Olympics
Olympic silver medalists for the United States in archery
World Archery Championships medalists
Medalists at the 1988 Summer Olympics
Medalists at the 1984 Summer Olympics
Pan American Games gold medalists for the United States
Pan American Games silver medalists for the United States
Pan American Games medalists in archery
Archers at the 1979 Pan American Games
Archers at the 1983 Pan American Games
Archers at the 1987 Pan American Games
Archers at the 1995 Pan American Games
Medalists at the 1983 Pan American Games